Teresa Lake is a glacial tarn in the Snake Range of White Pine County, Nevada, United States. It is located within Great Basin National Park, just north of Wheeler Peak.  It is a prominent feature along the park's Alpine Lakes Loop Trail.

References 

Lakes of Nevada
Lakes of White Pine County, Nevada
Lakes of the Great Basin
Great Basin National Park